Tecate Airport is a closed, paved airstrip located South of Tecate in Municipality of Tecate, Baja California, Mexico. The city is on the U.S.-Mexico border. The airport is now no longer operated  as an airport, and the runway is now used as a race track for street racing competitions.

See also
 Tecate

References

Defunct airports in Baja California
Tecate Municipality